is a railway station located in the third ward of Tanno, a suburb of Kitami city in Hokkaidō, Japan, and services the Sekihoku Main Line operated by JR Hokkaidō.

Station structure
The station is above ground, and consists of a single platform alongside the railway track. Trains operate in both directions along the line. The waiting room is constructed in the style of a small log cabin. The station itself is mostly used by students attending the nearby senior high school.

Station environs
As suburbanisation advances, residential area, agricultural land and shops and businesses exist in balance. In front of the station is a site for construction materials, and a large quantity of prefabricated buildings will be constructed.

History
November 1, 1986: The station opened as a temporary platform.
April 1, 1987: Since the privatisation of the national rail network, the station status was upgraded and ownership was transferred to JR Hokkaidō.

References

Railway stations in Hokkaido Prefecture
Railway stations in Japan opened in 1986
Kitami, Hokkaido